Thomas Hofer (born 21 January 1958) is a Swiss former backstroke swimmer. He competed in two events at the 1976 Summer Olympics.

References

External links
 

1958 births
Living people
Swiss male backstroke swimmers
Olympic swimmers of Switzerland
Swimmers at the 1976 Summer Olympics
Place of birth missing (living people)
20th-century Swiss people